Lara Pavlović (born 14 December 1998) is a Croatian handballer whose mother club is HC Podravka Vegeta.

Achievements
Croatian First League:
Winner: 2017
Croatian Cup:
Winner: 2017 
Croatian Cup Winner  2018 
Erice Italy 2019, Best scorer IT.

References

1998 births
Living people
People from Koprivnica
Croatian female handball players
RK Podravka Koprivnica players